Tiller Church is a parish church of the Church of Norway in Trondheim municipality in Trøndelag county, Norway.  It is located in the Tiller area in the city of Trondheim. It is the church for the Tiller parish which is part of the Heimdal og Byåsen prosti (deanery) in the Diocese of Nidaros. The white, wooden church was built in a long church style in 1901 by the architect Johan Kunig. The church seats about 200 people.

History
The earliest existing historical records of the church date back to the year 1533, but the church was not new that year. The first church in Tiller was likely a stave church that may have been built during the 14th century. In 1665, the old medieval church was torn down and replaced with a new building on the same site. The new timber-framed long church had a rectangular nave and narrower, rectangular choir, a tower on the roof over the middle of the nave. In 1688, a new porch outside the west entrance was added.

It was consecrated in 1801 by the Bishop Johan Christian Schønheyder, although some of the finish work and painting was completed until 1803. This new church was quite similar to the nearby Klæbu Church. It had an octagonal floor plan and a slate roof. This church was destroyed by a violent landslide on the evening of 7 March 1816. The landslide caused damage and death to people and animals in the area.

Soon after, planning for a new church began, but a new, safer site was to be chosen. The new building was consecrated on 29 September 1820. It was not completely finished by the day of its consecration. It was painted on the outside in 1825, and the altarpiece, carved by Halvor Søbstad, was painted in 1831. This was also an octagonal timber church.

Controversy arose over this decision, but the relatively new church was sold for demolition anyway. The new church was constructed in 1900-1901 and the old church was sold and taken down around the same time. The new church was designed by Johan Kunig. It was consecrated on 4 January 1901. The new long church had room for about 200 people and a tower on the west end. The church was renovated in 1946–1947.

On 9 September 2001, the church was very heavily damaged in a fire that was likely arson. Initially, there were concerns that the building could not be repaired, but in the end, the church was able to be repaired. The church was back in use in 2002 after a year of repairs.

Media gallery

See also
List of churches in Nidaros

References

Churches in Trondheim
Churches in Trøndelag
Long churches in Norway
Wooden churches in Norway
20th-century Church of Norway church buildings
Churches completed in 1901
14th-century establishments in Norway